The 2011 Connacht Senior Football Championship was that year's installment of the annual Connacht Senior Football Championship held under the auspices of the Connacht GAA. It was won by Mayo who defeated Roscommon in the final. This was Mayo's 42nd Connacht senior title. They played the same team in the final as the semi-final victory over Galway. That semi-final was hailed as the "Connacht Classico." The winning Mayo team received the J. J. Nestor Cup, and automatically advanced to the quarter-final stage of the 2011 All-Ireland Senior Football Championship.

Bracket

Quarter-finals

Semi-finals

Final

References

External links
Connacht GAA website

2C
Connacht Senior Football Championship